The Six Days of Munich was a six-day track cycling race held annually in Munich, Germany. The event was first held in 1933 with the last edition held in 2009. Starting in 1972, the event was held at the Olympiahalle.

Palmares

References

Cycle races in Germany
Sports competitions in Munich
Six-day races
Recurring sporting events established in 1933
1933 establishments in Germany
Recurring sporting events disestablished in 2009
2009 disestablishments in Germany
Defunct cycling races in Germany